The 2022 Pirelli GT4 America Series is the fourth season of the GT4 America Series. The season began on April 15 at Sonoma Raceway and will end on October 9 at Indianapolis Motor Speedway.

Calendar
The preliminary calendar was released on September 4, 2021, without disclosing the location of round 2. On October 10, 2021, the SRO announced that Ozarks International Raceway would fill the vacancy in the schedule, pending FIA circuit homologation. The round at Virginia International Raceway was also postponed one week to avoid a clash with the 2022 24 Hours of Le Mans. On April 27, 2022, the SRO announced that Ozarks round was replaced with NOLA Motorsports Park on the same date due to the challenges related with infrastructure and supply chain.

Entry list

Race results
Bold indicates overall winner

Championship standings
Scoring system
Championship points are awarded for the first ten positions in each race. Entries are required to complete 75% of the winning car's race distance in order to be classified and earn points. Individual drivers are required to participate for a minimum of 25 minutes in order to earn championship points.

Driver's championships

Notes

References

External links

GT4 America Series
GT4 America Series